Tukita is a rural locality (a selo) in Akhvakhsky District, Republic of Dagestan, Russia. The population was 763 as of 2010.

Geography 
Tukita is located 11 km southeast of Karata (the district's administrative centre) by road. Mesterukh is the nearest rural locality.

References 

Rural localities in Akhvakhsky District